Shi Yigong (born May 1967) is a Chinese biophysicist who serves as founding and the current president of Westlake University since April 2018.

He previously served as vice president of Tsinghua University from 2015 to 2018 and dean of Tsinghua University School of Life Sciences from 2009 to 2016.

Education
Shi Yigong received a Bachelor of Science with majors in biology and mathematics from Tsinghua University in 1989 and a Doctor of Philosophy in molecular biophysics from Johns Hopkins University in 1995.

During his graduate studies, he determined the crystal structure of several critical apoptotic proteins, including apaf-1, DIAP1, and the BIR3 domain of XIAP.

Career 
Shi Yigong was the Warner-Lambert/Parke-Davis Professor in the department of Molecular Biology at Princeton University. In June 2008, he was selected as a Howard Hughes Medical Institute investigator. However, he rejected the award upon resigning his position at Princeton University in order to pursue his career at Tsinghua University, becoming the dean of the School of Life Sciences there. In 2003, he was appointed a Chair Professor of Tsinghua's Department of Biological Sciences and Biotechnology. In late 2007, He was appointed Vice Director of Tsinghua's Institute of Biomedicine and Vice Dean of Tsinghua's Department of Biological Sciences and Biotechnology before returning to China. He was appointed Dean of Tsinghua's School of Life Sciences (replacing the Department of Biological Sciences and Biotechnology) in 2009. In 2018, he became the founding and the first president of Westlake University, a newly established private university in Hangzhou.

Shi renounced his U.S. citizenship in 2011 in order to reclaim his Chinese citizenship.

Awards
 2020, the Tan Kah Kee Science Award
 2017, the Future Science Prize in Life Sciences. 
 2016, the Ho Leung Ho Lee Award for Achievement in Science and Technology.
 2015, Nature Award for Mentoring in science.
 2014, the Gregori Aminoff Prize, from the Royal Swedish Academy of Sciences
 2013, foreign associate of the US National Academy of Sciences
 2013, foreign associate of the European Molecular Biology Organization
 2013, Academician Chinese Academy of Sciences, 中国科学院院士 
 2010 Raymond and Beverly Sackler International Prize
 Irving Sigal Young Investigator Award, from the Protein Society
 Searle Scholar Award
 Rita Allen Scholar Award
 2000, Wilson S. Stone Memorial Award
 1995, Paul Ehrlich Research Award in Basic Science

References

External links
 Dr. Shi Yigong Appointed Vice Director of Tsinghua’s Institute of Biomedicine, Tsinghua University News
 Why coming back to China is the best choice (in Chinese)
 Yigong Shi bio page, Howard Hughes Medical Institute

1967 births
Living people
People from Zhengzhou
Biologists from Henan
Chinese biophysicists
Chinese emigrants to the United States
Educators from Henan
Foreign associates of the National Academy of Sciences
Howard Hughes Medical Investigators
Johns Hopkins University alumni
Members of the Chinese Academy of Sciences
Former United States citizens
Physicists from Henan
Princeton University faculty
Tsinghua University alumni
Academic staff of Tsinghua University
Members of the 14th Chinese People's Political Consultative Conference